DXKW may refer to:
 DXKW (Cotabato), an FM radio station broadcasting in Tulunan, branded as GNN FM
 DXKW (Dipolog), an FM radio station broadcasting in Dipolog, branded as Magik FM